Clova may refer to:

Places
Clova, Angus, a community in Scotland
Clova, Quebec, a community in Canada
Clova railway station, Via Rail station in Clova, Quebec
Glen Clova, one of the Five Glens of Angus in Scotland

Other uses
Clova (virtual assistant), an intelligent personal assistant
Clova Court (born 1960), English heptathlete